Pobo may refer to:
 El Pobo, a town in Aragón, Spain
 El Pobo de Dueñas a town in the province of Guadalajara, Castile-La Mancha, Spain